The German Frisbee Sport Federation ( or DFV) is the association of frisbee players and teams in Germany.

External links
 Homepage of DFV

Frisbee